"Candy" is a song by funk group Cameo, released as the second single from their 1986 album Word Up!. The song features a solo by saxophonist Michael Brecker. "Honey", a reworked version with different lyrics was included on their next album, Machismo.

Charts
In the US, "Candy" reached number twenty-one on the Billboard Hot 100 and number one on the R&B charts in 1987 in the U.S. "Candy" also made the Top 10 on the US Dance charts. It also reached the top 40 in the UK, peaking at number 27 on 30 November 1986.

Certifications

Music video
The music video, shot on film, was directed by Zbigniew Rybczyński. Set against a backdrop of Times Square and various neon signs, the video features a high level of video compositing, with multiple layers of the band members and dancers appearing on screen in varying sizes and depths of field at once.

Samples
The song has been sampled by various artists, including 2Pac ("All Bout U", featured on his album All Eyez on Me), Will Smith ("Candy", on his album Big Willie Style), and Mariah Carey ("Loverboy", on the soundtrack to the film Glitter); the latter song would reach #2 on the Billboard Hot 100 in 2001. The Black Eyed Peas sampled it for the song "Ba Bump" from their album Monkey Business. Tichina Arnold sampled the basis for her song "Sweet Love" off her album "Soul Free." The Song was also sampled by R&B singer Jacquees on his song "Come Thru" which features hip-hop artist Rich Homie Quan. It was also sampled by 8ball & MJG on "Just Like Candy" off their album "The Album of the Year."

The song's lyrics "You're giving me a heart attack, It's the kind I like" were interpolated in the New Radicals song "Mother We Just Can't Get Enough" as "You're a heart attack, just the kind I like"

In popular culture
 The song appears in the 1999 film The Best Man.
 The song appears on the radio station Bounce FM in Grand Theft Auto: San Andreas
 The song appears in the 2010 film Death at a Funeral.
 British comedian Javone Prince finishes each episode of The Javone Prince Show with 'Candy Time', during which the audience and cast dance to the song.
 The song appears as part of a line dance at the end of Ep.4 of Series 2 of the British comedy-drama,  This Way Up .
 The song and music video are parodied in a 2019 episode of American animated television series Craig of the Creek, Season 2 Episode 1 "Memories of Bobby."
 The song appears in the wedding scene of the series finale episode of Killing Eve, ‘Hello, Losers’.

References

External links
 "Candy" at Discogs

1986 singles
1986 songs
Cameo (band) songs
Contemporary R&B ballads
Music videos directed by Zbigniew Rybczyński
Songs written by Larry Blackmon